The Minnesota Wild is an American professional ice hockey team based in Saint Paul, Minnesota. It plays in the Central Division of the Western Conference in the National Hockey League (NHL). The Wild joined the NHL in 2000 as an expansion team with the Columbus Blue Jackets. The Wild have played their home games at the Xcel Energy Center since its first season. The team has had four general managers since their inception.

Key

General managers

See also
List of NHL general managers

Notes
 A running total of the number of general managers of the franchise. Thus any general manager who has two or more separate terms as general manager is only counted once.

References

Minnesota Wild
 
Minnesota Wild general managers
general managers